The Women's Royal Naval Service (WRNS; popularly and officially known as the Wrens) was the women's branch of the United Kingdom's Royal Navy. First formed in 1917 for the First World War, it was disbanded in 1919, then revived in 1939 at the beginning of the Second World War, remaining active until integrated into the Royal Navy in 1993. WRNS included cooks, clerks, wireless telegraphists, radar plotters, weapons analysts, range assessors, electricians and air mechanics.

History

First World War
The Wrens were formed in 1917 during the First World War. On 10 October 1918, nineteen-year-old Josephine Carr from Cork became the first Wren to die on active service, when her ship, the RMS Leinster was torpedoed. By the end of the war the WRNS had 5,500 members, 500 of them officers. In addition, about 2,000 members of the WRAF had previously served with the WRNS supporting the Royal Naval Air Service and were transferred on the creation of the Royal Air Force. It was disbanded in 1919.

Second World War
At the beginning of the Second World War Vera Laughton Mathews was appointed as the director of the re-formed WRNS in 1939 with Ethel (Angela) Goodenough as her deputy. The WRNS had an expanded list of allowable activities, including flying transport planes. At its peak in 1944 it had 75,000 active servicewomen. During the war 102 WRNS members were killed in action and 22 wounded in action. One of the slogans used in recruitment posters was "Join the Wrens and free a man for the Fleet".

Wrens were prominent as support staff at the Government Code and Cypher School at Bletchley Park; as operators of the bombes and Colossus used to break Axis codes and cyphers

Post-war era

The WRNS remained in existence after the end of the war although Mathews retired in 1947 and Goodenough had died the year before. In the 1970s it became obvious that equal pay for women and the need to remove sexual discrimination meant that the WRNS and the Royal Navy would become one organisation. The key change was that women would become subject to the Naval Discipline Act 1957. Vonla McBride, who had experience in human resource management, became the Director of the WRNS in 1976, and members of the WRNS were subject to the same discipline as men by the next year.

In October 1990, during the Gulf War, HMS Brilliant carried the first women officially to serve on an operational warship. That same year, Chief Officer Pippa Duncan became the first WRNS officer to command a Royal Navy shore establishment. The WRNS was finally integrated into the Royal Navy in 1993, when women were allowed to serve on board navy vessels as full members of the crew. Female sailors are still informally known by the nicknames "wrens" or "Jennies" ("Jenny Wrens") in naval slang.

Before 1993, all women in the Royal Navy were members of the WRNS except nurses, who joined (and still join) Queen Alexandra's Royal Naval Nursing Service, and medical and dental officers, who were commissioned directly into the Royal Navy, held RN ranks, and wore WRNS uniform with gold RN insignia.

Ranks and insignia
The WRNS had its own ranking system, which it retained until amalgamation into the Royal Navy in 1993.

Officers

Enlisted

Ratings' titles were suffixed with their trade (e.g. Leading Wren Cook, Chief Wren Telegraphist).

Wrens wore the same rank insignia as their male equivalents, but in blue instead of gold. The "curls" atop officers' rank stripes were diamond-shaped instead of circular.

Uniforms
From 1939, Wren uniform, designed by leading British fashion designer Edward Molyneux, consisted of a double-breasted jacket and skirt, with shirt and tie, for all ranks (although similar working dress to the men could also be worn). Junior Ratings wore hats similar to those of their male counterparts (although with a more sloping top). Senior Ratings (Petty Officers and above) and officers wore tricorne hats. In tropical areas these had a white cover. All insignia, including cap badges and non-substantive (trade) badges, were blue.

List of directors 

 Dame Katharine Furse, 1917–1919
 Dame Vera Laughton Mathews, 1939–1946
 Dame Jocelyn Woollcombe, 1946–1950
 Commandant Dame Mary Lloyd, 1950–1954
 Commandant Dame Nancy Robertson, 1954–1958
 Commandant Dame Elizabeth Hoyer-Millar, 1958–1960
 Commandant Dame Jean Davies, 1961–1964
 Commandant Dame Margaret Drummond, 1964–1967
 Commandant Dame Marion Kettlewell, 1967–1970
 Commandant Daphne Blundell, 1970–1973
 Commandant Mary Talbot, 1973–1976
 Commandant Vonla McBride, 1976–1979
 Commandant Elizabeth Craig-McFeely, 1979–1982
 Commandant Patricia Swallow, 1982–1985
 Commandant Marjorie Fletcher, 1985–1988
 Commandant Anthea Larken, 1988–1991
 Commandant Anne Spencer, 1991–1993

See also

 Auxiliary Territorial Service
 Eswyn Lyster
 National Association of Training Corps for Girls
 Operation Outward
 Women in the World Wars
 Women's Royal Air Force (World War One)
 Women's Auxiliary Air Force
 Women's Royal Air Force
 Women's Royal Army Corps
 Military ranks of women's services in WWII

Notes

References

Further reading

Memoirs

External links 

 Search and download the WW1 records of those who served in the Women's Royal Naval Service (WRNS) from The National Archives.
 Wrens Recruitment Poster
 Women in the Royal Navy today Archived Page
 Association of Wrens

Naval history of World War II
All-female military units and formations
Royal Navy
British women in World War II
Military units and formations established in 1917
Military units and formations disestablished in 1993